Benjamin Breen (born 1985) is an American historian of science and medicine and an Associate Professor of History at the University of California, Santa Cruz. His book The Age of Intoxication (2019) was awarded the 2021 William H. Welch Medal from the American Association for the History of Medicine.

Education and early career
Breen received his Ph.D. in history from the University of Texas at Austin in 2015. His doctoral advisor was Jorge Canizares-Esguerra.

Research and writing
Breen’s work centers on the history of globalization and the long-term impacts of technological and environmental change.  He has written on early modern globalization; the Portuguese empire; Atlantic history; the early modern drug trade; the history of psychedelics; and the eighteenth-century impostor George Psalmanazar.

Between 2015 and 2017 Breen was a member of the Society of Fellows in the Humanities at Columbia University and a lecturer in Columbia's Department of History.

His writing has appeared in The Atlantic, The Paris Review, Aeon, The Public Domain Review, Lapham’s Quarterly, and Slate and been discussed in The New Yorker,The Washington Post, Radio New Zealand, and Le Point.

He was a co-founder and editor of The Appendix and writes the history blog Res Obscura.

Fellowships and awards
 2021 The William H. Welch Medal of the American Association for the History of Medicine 
 2021 National Endowment for the Humanities Award for Faculty.
 2014-15 Huntington Library visiting fellow of Lincoln College, Oxford. 
 2011-12 Fulbright Fellowship (Portugal).

Books
 The Age of Intoxication: Origins of the Global Drug Trade (University of Pennsylvania Press, 2019).

References

Living people
1985 births
University of Texas alumni
American historians
University of California, Santa Cruz faculty
Writers about globalization